Fort Providence Water Aerodrome  was located  west of Fort Providence, Northwest Territories, Canada. The airport was listed as abandoned in the 15 March 2007 Canada Flight Supplement.

See also
Fort Providence Airport

References

Defunct seaplane bases in the Northwest Territories